The 2006 Dunlop British Open Championships was held at the University of Nottingham from 14–19 November 2006. Nick Matthew won the title defeating Thierry Lincou in the final.

Seeds

Draw and results

First qualifying round

Second qualifying round

Final qualifying round

Main draw

References

Men's British Open Squash Championships
Squash in England
Men's British Open
Men's British Open Squash Championship
Men's British Open Squash Championship
2000s in Nottingham
Sport in Nottingham